Mukhbir – The Story of a Spy is an Indian spy-thriller original series directed by Shivam Nair and Jayprad Desai and produced by Vaibhav Modi under the banner of Victor Tango Entertainment. The series is the adaptation of the retired Joint Director of the Intelligence Bureau Maloy Krishna Dhar's novel, Mission to Pakistan: An Intelligence Agent in Pakistan and stars Zain Khan Durrani, Prakash Raj, Adil Hussain, Barkha Bisht, Harsh Chhaya, Satyadeep Mishra, Bijou Thaangjam and Zoya Afroz in the pivotal roles. The plot follows a secret agent who led India to evade several aggressive advances from the enemy country by providing intelligence and by helping India in 1965 war and give a befitting reply to Pakistan 's Operation Gibraltar and Operation Grand Slam maneuvres. The series released on ZEE5 on 11 November 2022.

Cast 
 Prakash Raj as S. K. S. Moorthy (based on K. Sankaran Nair)
 Zain Khan Durrani as Harfan Bukhari/Kamran Bakhsh 
 Adil Hussain as Ramkishore Negi (based on R. N. Kao)
 Harsh Chhaya as Major General Agha Khan (based on General Yahya Khan)
 Satyadeep Mishra as Alamgir
 Barkha Bisht as Begum Anar
 Dilip Shankar as Col. Zaidi, Director-General of ISI (based on Brigadier Riaz Hussain)
 Zoya Afroz as Jamila Ahmed
 Atul Kumar as Brigadier Habibullah
 Karan Oberoi as Kamal Kapoor
 Bijou Thaangjam as Junior Officer 
 Sushil Pandey as Purshottam/Qasim
 Suneel Shanbag as Joydeep Burman
 Sushil Dhahiya as Pakistani President Hidayat Ali Khan (based on President Ayub Khan)
 Karan Mehta as Major Gunjeet Sodhi
 Vijay Kashyap as Prime Minister Lal Bahadur Shastri
 Avantika Akerkar as Prime Minister Indira Gandhi
 Jaya Swaminathan as Suhasini Moorthy 
 Richard Bhakti Klein as Russell Clarke

Episodes

Season 1

Release 
The series was announced with eight episodes on the occasion of India's 76th Independence Day on 15 August 2022. It has premiered on the streaming service, ZEE5 from 11 November 2022. It is dubbed in 3 languages Punjabi, Telugu and Tamil.

References

External links 

 
 Mukhbir - The Story of a Spy on ZEE5

Hindi-language web series
2022 web series debuts
Thriller web series